Peter Brook RBA (1927–2009) was an English artist best known for his landscape paintings. He was nicknamed "The Pennine Landscape Painter" for good reason.

Life and career
Peter Brook was born in Scholes, Holme Valley, West Yorkshire to farmer parents. He was educated at Goldsmith's College where he studied to become a teacher while he attended evening drawing classes and visited art galleries. He returned to West Yorkshire where he worked as a teacher, first at Rastrick and then Sowerby. He married his wife Molly in 1950.

Brook painted rural landscapes, farmhouses and scenes from different facets of British life. 

In his early career he painted the houses, and mills, surrounding his home in Brighouse, West Yorkshire. He taught art at a local school and often told his students that "inspiration was all around"

It was only when he was offered a contract with Agnews of London that Peter was able to become a full time artist. He worked with Agnews for many years, with numerous exhibitions in London, as well as in the USA and Australia, though Peter himself never travelled abroad. 

He was elected to the Royal Society of British Artists in 1962.

His work caught the eye of many celebrities of the day including Rodney Bewes, Frank Windsor, Tom Courtenay and others. His most famous collector was Yorkshire born Hollywood star James Mason, who purchased over 20 of Peters original paintings. Peter Brook featured in the documentary "Home James" which saw James Mason visit his home town of Huddersfield and saw clips of him out walking on the moors with Peter Brook as well as a brief glimpse of Peter at work in his studio.

Peter Brook's work is held in the Tate Gallery and he has featured, twice, in the annual desk diaries.

His trademark became the inclusion of himself and his dog in many of his paintings

Peter achieved great commercial success before his death, but remained a hugely modest and private man.

Since his death in 2009 his popularity has remained high, with his original paintings highly sought after by collectors around the world. Reproduction prints, approved by Peters estate, continue to make his work accessible for all, something Peter Brook himself was always keen to ensure.

References
https://www.yorkshirepost.co.uk/arts-and-culture/peter-brook-tribute-modest-artist-who-brought-life-landscape-1958232

External links
 Official website
 
 Peter Brook Artwork

1927 births
2009 deaths
20th-century English painters
21st-century English painters
21st-century English male artists
English landscape painters
English male painters
People from Holmfirth
20th-century English male artists